Osage Township is an inactive township in Crawford County, in the U.S. state of Missouri.

Osage Township was established in 1847, deriving its name from the Osage Nation.

References

Townships in Missouri
Townships in Crawford County, Missouri